The Castle of Temse also known as 'the (old) castle', 'Arcques', 'Hercken' or 'Herkenstein', was a castle/moated castle that was located on the left bank of the Scheldt in Temse. It existed before the 12th century and was demolished in 1782. More to the north of the old castle, a new castle was built from 1783 to 1787 in classicist style, which in turn was demolished in 1965 to make way for the swimming pool of Temse. There are no remnants of the old castle, except for the current Scheldt Park, which belonged to the domain of the old and new castle. A model of the old castle can be seen in the municipal museum of Temse.

Gallery

References

Castles in East Flanders
Temse